The Queensland Guyot  is an extinct volcanic seamount of the Tasmantid Seamount Chain.

It was described as a seamount in 1961.

The waters above it are incorporated in the Central Eastern Marine Park, an Australian marine park.

References

Seamounts of the Tasman Sea
Guyots
Hotspot volcanoes
Polygenetic volcanoes
Miocene volcanoes
Volcanoes of the Tasman Sea